Sir Francis Grenville Clarke  (14 March 1879 – 13 February 1955) was an Australian politician.

He was born in Sunbury to grazier William John Clarke (later Sir William Clarke, 1st Baronet) and Janet Marion Snodgrass. His grandfather William John Turner Clarke had been an early member of the Victorian Parliament, while his father had also served in the parliament. His brothers Sir Rupert Clarke and Russell Clarke and nephew Michael Clarke were also MPs. Frank Clarke attended Scotch College, the University of Melbourne, and Oxford University, becoming a grazier with widespread properties. On 24 July 1901 he married Nina Ellis Cotton, with whom he had six children. In 1913 he was elected to the Victorian Legislative Council as a non-Labor member for Northern Province. He was Minister of Lands from 1917 to 1919, Minister of Water Supply from 1917 to 1921, and Minister of Public Works from 1919 to 1923. In 1923 he left the ministry and was elected President of the Victorian Legislative Council, a position he held for the next twenty years. During this time he changed provinces twice, to Melbourne South in 1925 and Monash in 1937. During his time in parliament he was a member of the Nationalist, United Australia, Liberal and Liberal and Country parties. He was knighted in 1926. Clarke died at South Yarra in 1955.

References

1879 births
1955 deaths
Nationalist Party of Australia members of the Parliament of Victoria
United Australia Party members of the Parliament of Victoria
Liberal Party of Australia members of the Parliament of Victoria
Members of the Victorian Legislative Council
Presidents of the Victorian Legislative Council
Australian Knights Commander of the Order of the British Empire
Australian politicians awarded knighthoods
People from Sunbury, Victoria
Australian people of English descent
People educated at Scotch College, Melbourne
Politicians from Melbourne
University of Melbourne alumni
Alumni of the University of Oxford